William Ambrose Lonergan (4 July 1884 – 13 August 1916) was an Australian rules footballer who played with Essendon in the Victorian Football League (VFL).

Notes

External links 

1884 births
1916 deaths
Australian rules footballers from Victoria (Australia)
Essendon Football Club players